Condino is a former comune, now a frazione of Borgo Chiese in Trentino in the northern Italian region Trentino-Alto Adige/Südtirol, located about  southwest of Trento.

Condino borders the following municipalities: Daone, Breno, Castel Condino, Bagolino, Cimego, Brione, Ledro and Storo.

Demographic evolution

References

External links
 

Cities and towns in Trentino-Alto Adige/Südtirol